Stavern is a small water-side town in Larvik municipality in Vestfold County, Norway. It is south of the city of Larvik. Currently there are around 3,000 inhabitants in Stavern. It is a small town where tourism is one of the most important sources of income. During summer, the population increases to around 30,000-40,000 people, due to camping sites and cottages around the town centre as well as boats visiting the harbour.

Stavern experiences 200 days of sunshine per year. Consequentially, Stavern's population more than doubles during summers. From the mid 1750s until 1864, Stavern was home to the nation's main naval base located in a shipyard in Fredriksvern. A gunpowder tower and commandant's house remain on Citadel Island, a current refuge for artists. The town is also home of Hall of Remembrance, a monument dedicated to seamen killed during World Wars I and II.

History
Stavern has probably been a harbour since ancient times. The name is found in written sources from the 11th century and the 12th century where it is referred to as a good fishing harbour. Stavern in the 17th and 18th century was an important port for civil ship traffic from Norway to Denmark and Sweden.

The port and naval base of Staverns Fortress (until 1930 named Fredriksvern) was established as a municipality on 1 January 1838 (see formannskapsdistrikt). Even though it was an important port it was first given its status as a town (kjøpstad) 1 July 1942. The small town and municipality of Stavern was merged with the larger town of Larvik 1 January 1988.

Its former and current name is Stavern, but from 1799 to 1930 even the civilian part of the town was titled Fredriksværn as its only function was as the site of that naval base. From 1942 the town was Norway's smallest until it merged with Larvik in 1988 and lost its town status. In 1996 Stavern was again elevated to town status.

During the 20th century, Stavern became a popular site for artists and craftsmen. The poet Herman Wildenvey, the writer Jonas Lie as well as the painters Hans Gude and Christian Krohg all lived in Stavern at some point in their lives. Today, the town is well known in southern Norway for its many exhibitions and art galleries. Stavern also is the site of Minnehallen, the national memorial to fallen sailors of World War I and World War II and a statue of the 18th century naval hero Peder Tordenskjold.

The name
The Old Norse form of the name was Staferni. The first element is stafr 'staff, stick', the last element is the suffix -erni (often used in names of islands). What the word stafr is referring to here is unknown (see for instance under Stavanger).

Notable residents
Hjalmar Hjorth Boyesen,  Norwegian-American author, was born at Fredriksvern.

References

External links 
Short history of Stavern

Cities and towns in Norway
Populated coastal places in Norway
Populated places in Vestfold og Telemark
Former municipalities of Norway
Larvik